Atrypanius pulchellus is a species of beetle in the family Cerambycidae. It was described by Henry Walter Bates in 1863.

References

Beetles described in 1863